Durgadas Bannerjee  (1893–1943) was an Indian Bengali film actor who appeared in many roles from 1922 to 1943.

Early life 
Bannerjee was born on 3 December 1893  to a zamindar family at Kalikapur, Kolkata. Garia Rajbari was his ancestral home.

Bannerjee received his early education from South Garia School in South Garia.  He then studied art at the Bou Bazar Art School. Bannerjee later received his  degree in art from Government College of Art and Craft in Kolkata.

Career
Bannerjee started working as a Word Writer and Title Writer in silent movies for Madan Theatre and the Taj Mahal Film Company.

In 1922, Bannerjee start acting for Taj Mahal, performing small roles under Sisir Bhaduri in films like Andhare Alo. Bannerjee's first leading role was in Maan Bhanjan (1923).

In 1923, Bannerjee briefly acted in plays at the Star Theatre in Kolkata under Aporesh Chandra Mukherjee. One of his prominent roles was as Bikarna in Karanarjun (1923). That same year, Bannerjee acted in Naresh Mitra's film Chandranath.

Bannerjee appeared in over 19 silent movies as a lead actor.  In 1931, Bannerjee appeared in the first Bengali language sound film, Dena Paona (1931), which was a major hit.

Priya Bandhobi (1943) was Bannerjee's last film.

Personal life
Bannerjee married Bina pani Banerjee, an educationalist. He was a grand uncle of musician Sudipto “Buti” Banerjee of Bengali rock band, Cactus. He died in 1943.

Selected filmography

References

External links 
 

1893 births
20th-century Bengalis
Bengali Hindus
Government College of Art & Craft alumni
1943 deaths
Bengali male actors
Male actors in Bengali cinema
Indian male stage actors
Bengali theatre personalities
Indian male silent film actors